Nea-Nidelvvassdraget is a watercourse in the municipalities of Tydal, Selbu, and Trondheim in Trøndelag county, Norway. Development of the area had already begun in 1890 with the development of the Øvre Leirfoss power station.

Important rivers in the Nea-Nidelvvassdraget watercourse are the Nidelva, Nea, Rotla, Lødølja, and Tya. Amongst the biggest lakes are Sylsjön, Nesjøen, Stugusjøen, Finnkoisjøen, and Selbusjøen.

References

External links
 Map of Nea-Nidelvvassdraget (TEV)

Tydal
Selbu
Klæbu
Trondheim
Landforms of Trøndelag
Rivers of Trøndelag
Rivers of Norway